Hunter Gabriel Kansas Thompson (born May 29, 1991) is an American Christian musician. His first release was with Bethel Music in 2013, Gabriel Kansas EP. The second EP, Swan Song, was released in 2014 by Bethel Music. This album was his breakthrough release upon the Billboard magazine Christian Albums and Heatseekers Albums charts. In 2019, he released three singles and a full-length record, "No Books About Me" with Watershed Music Group.

Early life
Thompson was born on May 29, 1991, in the city of Saint Paul, Minnesota to father, Paul Allen Thompson, and his mother, Kathryn Kansas Thompson. He currently is based out of Redding, California, and attends worship services as a worship leader at Bethel Church.

Music career
Thompson's music career commenced in 2012 when he recorded his song "My Dear" as part of Bethel Music's album The Loft Sessions. His solo career then took off with the EP, Gabriel Kansas, which was released February 22, 2013, by Bethel Music. His second EP, Swan Song, was released on December 2, 2014, by Bethel Music. The EP was his breakthrough release upon the Billboard magazine charts, where it placed on the Christian Albums chart at No. 35 and on the Heatseekers Albums chart at No. 10.

Discography

EPs

References

External links
 

1991 births
Living people
American performers of Christian music
Musicians from Minnesota
Musicians from California
Songwriters from Minnesota
Songwriters from California